The 2002–03 season, their 80th in the English Football League, saw Crewe Alexandra compete in the Football League Second Division where they finished in 2nd position with 86 points, gaining automatic promotion to the First Division.

Final league table

Results
Crewe Alexandra's score comes first

Legend

Football League Second Division

FA Cup

Football League Cup

Football League Trophy

Squad statistics

References

External links
 Crewe Alexandra 2002–03 at Soccerbase.com (select relevant season from dropdown list)

Crewe Alexandra F.C. seasons
Crewe Alexandra